Nydal is a village in Ringsaker Municipality in Innlandet county, Norway.

Since 2012, it has been included as a part of the urban area of the town of Hamar so the population and area data for this village area has not been separately tracked by Statistics Norway.

References

Ringsaker
Villages in Innlandet